"Mano a Mano" is a song performed by Portuguese singer Salvador Sobral. The song was released in Portugal as a digital download on 11 May 2018 as the lead single from his second studio album Paris, Lisboa. The song peaked at number 84 on the Portuguese Singles Chart.

Live performances
He performed the song live at the final of the Eurovision Song Contest 2018 on 12 May 2018 with Caetano Veloso.

Music video
A music video to accompany the release of "Mano a Mano" was first released onto YouTube on 10 May 2018 at a total length of four minutes and two seconds.

Track listing

Charts

Release history

References

2018 songs
2018 singles
Portuguese-language songs